Peligrosa is a Venezuelan telenovela written by Vivel Nouel for Venevisión and broadcast between 1994 and 1995. The series  lasted 164 episodes and was distributed internationally by Venevisión International.

Víctor Cámara, Rosalinda Serfaty and Emma Rabbe starred as the main protagonists.

Synopsis
Luis Fernando is handsome, rich and accustomed to getting his own way. When his best friend Ernesto steals one of his lovers, Luis Fernando looks for a way to get even, and finds it when he meets Elisa. Elisa, a beautiful young girl who has grown up extremely poor in a violent neighborhood, makes a living as a pickpocket. When she tries to rob Luis Fernando, he sees beyond her aggressive facade and recognizes a diamond in the rough. He immediately realizes that she is exactly what he needs to make Ernesto pay for his treachery. From this moment on, Luis Fernando decides to transform the coarse Elisa into an elegant, refined lady and use her for his selfish plan to hurt his friend and unmask her as a fraud. But the passionate love that they have come to feel for each other, keep Elisa and Luis Fernando trapped in a tempestuous relationship... one that will place them in many tragic, unexpected situations, until their story reaches a dramatic and utterly surprising conclusion.

Cast

Main cast
Víctor Cámara as Luis Fernando Amengual
Rosalinda Serfaty as Elisa Camacho
Emma Rabbe as Clementina Villegas
Elizabeth Morales as Silvia Martínez / Jessica Lárez
Juan Carlos Vivas as Padre Jesús Amengual
Elluz Peraza as Ana 
Carlos Olivier as Arturo Ramírez

Supporting Cast
 
Eva Blanco as Chela Camacho
Liliana Durán as Leandra de Amengual
Agustina Martín
Eva Moreno as Josefina de Villegas 
Laura Zerra
Francisco Ferrari as Rigoberto
Gonzalo Velutini as Ernesto París
Perucho Conde as Coliseo "Corcho" Camacho 
Eliseo Perera as Padre Andrés
Humberto Tancredi as Jacinto Villegas
Regino Jiménez
Javier Vidal 
Daniel Alvarado as Gavilan
Denise Novell as La Gata
Azabache as Manzura
Ana Martínez as Angelina Villegas
Carlos D'arco as León Ramírez
Jeniffer Rodríguez as Bettina Villegas

References

External links
 
 Opening Credits

1990s Venezuelan television series
1994 telenovelas
1994 Venezuelan television series debuts
1995 Venezuelan television series endings
Venevisión telenovelas
Venezuelan telenovelas
Spanish-language telenovelas
Television shows set in Caracas